Alles brennt is the fourth studio album by the German singer-songwriter Johannes Oerding. It was released by Columbia Records on January 30, 2015 in German-speaking Europe.

Track listing

Charts

Weekly charts

Year-end charts

Certifications

References

2015 albums
Johannes Oerding albums